The Black Brook is a small river in Calderdale, West Yorkshire, England.

The Black Brook rises near the border of Calderdale and Kirklees next to Scammonden Dam. It flows downwards through Stainland Dean, and then between Greetland and Stainland. Most of the river, at this point, forms a parish border between the parishes of Greetland and Stainland. The Holywell Brook flows into the Black Brook before flowing into the River Calder at West Vale.

The valley that the Black Brook flows through is named the Blackburne Valley.

See also 
Rivers of the United Kingdom

References

External links

Rivers of Calderdale